The 2002 Philippine Basketball Association (PBA) All-Filipino Cup, or known as the 2002 Selecta-PBA All-Filipino Cup for sponsorship reasons, was the third and last conference of the 2002 PBA season. It started on October 20 and ended on December 25, 2002. The tournament is an All-Filipino format, which doesn't require an import or a pure-foreign player for each team.

Format
The following format will be observed for the duration of the conference:
 Single-round robin eliminations; 9 games per team; Teams are then seeded by basis on win–loss records.
 The top two teams after the eliminations will automatically qualify to the semifinals, the next four teams will advance to the quarterfinals.
Quarterfinals:
Knockout round.
QF1: #3 vs. #6
QF2: #4 vs. #5
Best-of-three semifinals:
SF1: #1 vs. QF2
SF2: #2 vs. QF1
Third-place playoff: losers of the semifinals
Best-of-five finals: winners of the semifinals

Elimination round

Team standings

Sixth seed playoff

Bracket

Quarterfinals

Semifinals

(1) Red Bull vs. (5) Alaska

(2) San Miguel vs. (3) Coca Cola

Third place playoff

Finals

References

External links
 PBA.ph

All-Filipino Cup
PBA Philippine Cup